Didier Fassin, born in 1955, is a French anthropologist and sociologist. He is the James D. Wolfensohn Professor of Social Science at the Institute for Advanced Study at Princeton University and holds a Direction of Studies in Political and Moral Anthropology at the École des Hautes Études en Sciences Sociales in Paris. He has been appointed to the Chair of Public Health at the Collège de France. Fassin was elected to the American Philosophical Society in 2022.

Career 
Initially trained as a physician in Paris, Fassin practiced internal medicine as an infectious disease specialist at the Hospital Pitié-Salpétrière and taught public health at the Universite Pierre et Marie Curie (present day Sorbonne University). He has been the physician of the Home for the Dying in Calcutta and the initiator of a national program of prevention of rheumatic heart disease in Tunisia where it was the first cause of death among young adults.  Later shifting to the social sciences, he received his M.A. from the University of Paris, and his PhD from the École des Hautes Études en Sciences Sociales, writing his thesis on power relations and health inequalities in Senegal.

After having been granted a fellowship by the French Institute for Andean Studies to investigate maternal mortality and living conditions among Indian women in Ecuador, Fassin became professor of sociology in 1991 at the University of Paris North. There, he created Cresp, the Center for Research on Social and Health Issues, working on public health problems such as the history of child lead poisoning in France and the politics of Aids in Sub-Saharan Africa.

Elected in 1999 as director of studies in social anthropology at the École des Hautes Études en Sciences Sociales, Fassin founded and directed from 2007 to 2010 Iris, the Interdisciplinary Research Institute for Social Sciences, in an effort to bring together anthropologists, sociologists, historians, political scientists and legal scholars around contemporary political and social issues.  He himself developed a long-term program exploring the multiple facets of humanitarianism in local and international policies, especially towards the poor, the immigrant and refugees, as well as victims of violence and epidemics.  In parallel, he launched a research project on borders and boundaries in an attempt to articulate the issues around immigration and racialization, which were at the time dealt with in separate fields.

In 2008, Fassin received an Advanced Grant by the European Research Council for his program Towards a Critical Moral Anthropology. To reappraise theoretical issues in the analysis of morals and moralities, he started an ethnographic research on police, justice and prison in France. This research gave birth to the proposal of a moral anthropology of the state. In 2009, he succeeded Clifford Geertz at the Institute for Advanced Study, in Princeton, and became the first James D. Wolfensohn Professor of Social Science.  His inaugural public lecture was entitled “Critique of Humanitarian Reason”. In 2010, he also became Visiting Professor at the Universities of Princeton and Hong Kong. In 2019 he was elected at the Collège de France on the Annual Chair in Public Health. His Leçon inaugurale was on "The Inequality of Lives". 

In 2016, he received the Gold Medal of the Swedish Society for Anthropology and Geography, which is awarded every three years to an anthropologist. That same year, he gave the Tanner Lectures on Human Values at the University of California, Berkeley, on “The Will to Punish”, and the Adorno Lectures at the Goethe University of Frankfurt on “A Critical Anthropology of Life”. In 2018, he was the first social scientist to be given the Nomis Distinguished Scientist Award, which will support five years of research on crises.  As part of this program, he developed in collaboration with Axel Honneth, an international program on crisis and critique.

Engagement 
In France, Fassin has been involved in the politics of science, as a member of the Scientific Council of the French Institute of Health and Medical Research (Inserm), and of the Scientific Council of the City of Paris. In 2006, he became the chair of the Committee for Humanities and Social Science in the French National Agency for Research, the main funding agency for scientific research in France. In 2017, he was appointed to the Scientific Council of the Contrôleur général des lieux de privation de liberté, the independent French Ombudsman for Prisons. 

In the United States, as a member of the Committee of World Anthropology of the American Anthropological Association from 2010 to 2013, he was committed to the global exchange of knowledge and the reduction of the gap between the North and the South in the development of social science. This concern translated in 2015 in a three-year cycle Summer Program in Social Science for Latin American, Middle Eastern and African junior scholars. In connection with his work on prison and punishment, Fassin was invited in 2018 to join the New Jersey Criminal Sentencing and Disposition Commission, which has been appointed by the Governor of the State to make recommendations about the penal and corrections system, as Guest Advisor. 

Apart from his academic career, Fassin has been involved in various solidarity non-governmental organizations in France. In 1996 he founded the Medico-social Unit Villermé at the Hospital Avicenne to provide health care to uninsured and undocumented patients. He was administrator and later Vice-president of MSF, Doctors Without Borders, from 1999 to 2003, and is currently President of Comede, the Health Committee for the Exiles since 2006. A public intellectual, he frequently intervenes in the media on issues related to his research such as immigration, asylum, discrimination, social justice, law and order policies.  He regards the social sciences as a form of “presence to the world” and has developed a program on the public life of ethnography.

Distinctions 
 2007: Chevalier des Palmes Académiques (French distinction for commitment to higher education)
 2008: Laureate of the Advanced Grant Ideas by the European Research Council for Towards a Critical Moral Anthropology.
 2010: Douglass Prize for the Best Book in the Anthropology of Europe for The Empire of Trauma
 2010: France Culture Award of the Best Essay for Les Nouvelles Frontières de la Société Française
 2012: Honorable Mention for the Bateson Prize by the Society for Cultural Anthropology for Humanitarian Reason
 2016: Vega Gold Medal, Swedish Society for Anthropology and Geography, awarded for "scientific contribution to anthropology"
 2018: Nomis Distinguished Scientist Award, in recognition of "exploration of unconventional academic paths"
 2019: Research Prize of the French Red Cross Foundation, for work on "moral economies and the innovative perspective it offers on the analysis of international humanitarian aid" 
 2019: 2nd place Victor Turner Prize in Ethnographic Writing for Prison Worlds. An Ethnography of the Carceral Condition
 2020: Doctorate Honoris Causa of the University of Liège.
 2020: Writing Residency at the Villa Medici, French Academy in Rome

Major publications

As author 
 Pouvoir et Maladie en Afrique. Anthropologie Sociale de la Banlieue de Dakar, Paris: Presses Universitaires de France, 1992.
 L'Espace Politique de la Santé. Essai de Généalogie, Paris: Presses Universitaires de France, 1996.
 Les Enjeux Politiques de la Santé. Etudes Sénégalaises, Équatoriennes et Françaises, Paris: Karthala, 2000.
 When Bodies Remember. Experience and Politics of AIDS in South Africa, Berkeley: University of California Press, 2007 (French version La Découverte 2006).
 The Empire of Trauma. An Inquiry into the Condition of Victimhood, with Richard Rechtman, Princeton: Princeton University Press, 2009 (French version L’Empire du Traumatisme, Flammarion, 2007).
 Humanitarian Reason. A Moral History of the Present, Berkeley: University of California Press, 2011 (French version La Raison Humanitaire, Hautes Etudes-Gallimard-Seuil, 2010).
 Enforcing Order. An Anthropology of Urban Policing, Cambridge: Polity Press, 2013 (French version La Force de l’Ordre. Une Anthropologie de la Police des Quartiers, Paris: Seuil, 2011).
 At the Heart of the State. The Moral World of Institutions, with Yasmine Bouagga et al. (French version Juger, Réprimer, Accompagner. Essai sur la morale de l’État, Paris: Seuil, 2011).
 Four Lectures on Ethics. Anthropological Perspectives, with Michael Lambek, Veena Das and Webb Keane, Chicago: Hau Books.
 Prison Worlds. An Anthropology of the Carceral Condition, Cambridge: Polity Press, 2016 (French version L’Ombre du monde. Une anthropologie de la condition carcérale, Paris: Seuil, 2011).
The Will to Punish, ed. by Christopher Kutz, Oxford: Oxford University Press, 2018 (French Version Punir. Une passion contemporaine, Paris: Seuil, 2017).
Le monde à l’épreuve de l’asile. Essai d’anthropologie critique, (Charenton-le-Pont: Presses de la Société d’ethnologie, 2017).
Life. A Critical User's Manual, Cambridge, UK; Medford, MA: Polity Press, 2018 (French Version La Vie. Mode d'emploi critique, Paris: Seuil, 2018).
Mort d'un voyageur. Une contre-enquête, (Paris: Seuil, 2020).

As editor 
 Sociétés, Développement et Santé (with Yannick Jaffré), Paris: Ellipses, 1990.
 Mujeres de los Andes. Condiciones de Vida y Salud (with Anne-Claire Defossez et Mara Viveros), Bogotá: Universidad Externado de Colombia-IFEA, 1992.
 Les Lois de l'Inhospitalité. Les Politiques de l’Immigration à l'Épreuve des Sans-papiers (with Alain Morice et Catherine Quiminal), Paris: La Découverte, 1997.
 Les Figures Urbaines de la Santé Publique. Enquête sur des Expériences Locales, Paris: La Découverte, 1998.
 Les Inégalités Sociales de Santé (with Annette Leclerc, Hélène Grandjean, Thierry Lang et Monique Kaminski), Paris: Inserm-La Découverte, 2000.
 Critique de la Santé Publique. Une Approche Anthropologique (avec Jean-Pierre Dozon), Paris:  Balland, 2001.
 Le Gouvernement des Corps (with Dominique Memmi), Paris: Editions de l’Ecole des Hautes Études en Sciences Sociales, 2004.
 Les Constructions de l’Intolérable. Etudes d’Anthropologie et d’Histoire sur les Frontières de l’Espace Moral (with Patrice Bourdelais), Paris: La Découverte, 2005.
 De la Question Sociale à la Question Raciale ? Représenter la Société Française (with Eric Fassin), Paris: La Découverte, 2006, 2nd edition 2010.
 Les Politiques de l’Enquête. Epreuves Ethnographiques (with Alban Bensa), Paris : La Découverte, 2008.
 Contemporary States of Emergency. The Politics of Military and Humanitarian Interventions (with Mariella Pandolfi), New York: Zone Books, 2010.
 L’Etat des Savoirs de la Santé Publique (with Boris Hauray), Paris: La Découverte, 2010.
 Les Nouvelles Frontières de la Société Française, Paris : La Découverte, 2010., 2nd édition 2012.
 Économies morales Contemporaines (with Jean-Sébastien Eideliman), Paris : La Découverte, 2012.
 Moral Anthropology. A Companion, Malden : Wiley-Blackwell, 2012.
 Moral Anthropology; A Critical Reader, with Samuel Lézé, London: Routledge, 2014.
If Truth Be Told. The Politics of Public Ethnography, Durham: Duke University Press, 2017.
Writing the World of Policing. The Difference Ethnography Makes, Chicago: The University of Chicago Press, 2017.
A Time for Critique, with Bernard E. Harcourt, New York: Columbia University Press, 2019.
Deepening Divides. How Territorial Borders and Social Boundaries Delineate our World, London: Pluto Press, 2019.

References

External links
 Interview in “La Suite dans les Idées” by Sylvain Bourmeau 
 Inaugural lecture “Critique of Humanitarianism” at the Institute for Advanced Study 
 Keynote lecture “The Body and the State” at the New School for Social Research
 Presentation of scientific contribution to the field of medical anthropology

Living people
1955 births
Pierre and Marie Curie University alumni
School for Advanced Studies in the Social Sciences alumni
French anthropologists
French sociologists
Medical anthropologists
Institute for Advanced Study faculty
Members of the American Philosophical Society